Zach Kirby (born January 2, 1985, in Atlanta, Georgia) is a retired professional soccer player.

Career

Youth and college
Zach Kirby grew up in Roswell, Georgia, where he attended Pope High School. During his youth career, Zach played club soccer for United Quest where his team was a four-time Georgia State Champion. He was selected to join the Olympic Development Program's Georgia State and Southeast Regional Teams and was also a National Team participant during his youth career from 1999 to 2002.

Zach received an athletic scholarship to play college soccer at Boston University from 2003 to 2006. As Team Captain during his senior year in 2006, he was awarded the America East Conference Defender of the Year, selected to the America East All Conference Team, and recognized on a national level as an All-American athlete. He graduated with a bachelor's degree in psychology and business administration.

Professional
Zach Kirby was drafted 22nd overall in the 2nd round of the 2007 Major League Soccer Supplemental Draft by the Los Angeles Galaxy. This was the same year David Beckham signed his first contract with the Los Angeles Galaxy and the club retained Zach's player rights for two years. Zach finished the 2007 season with the Wilmington Hammerhead of the United Soccer League's (USL) Second Division. In 2008, he signed with the Atlanta Silverbacks of the USL First Division. In 2009, he signed with Miami F.C. of the North American Soccer League (NASL) where he was named the 2009 Defensive Player of the Year. From 2010 to 2011, Zach finished his career as the Team Captain for the Fort Lauderdale Strikers of the NASL while he was receiving his Master of Business Administration with a specialization in Sports Management from Florida Atlantic University.

Zach Kirby retired from professional soccer on July 18, 2011. Currently, Zach is a Financial Advisor for Merrill Lynch Wealth Management in Miami, Florida.

References

External links
Zach Kirby - Merrill Lynch

1985 births
Living people
American soccer players
Boston University Terriers men's soccer players
LA Galaxy players
Wilmington Hammerheads FC players
Atlanta Silverbacks players
Miami FC (2006) players
Fort Lauderdale Strikers players
USL Second Division players
USL First Division players
USSF Division 2 Professional League players
North American Soccer League players
LA Galaxy draft picks
Soccer players from Georgia (U.S. state)
Association football defenders